Gacki is a village in the administrative district of Gmina Szydłów, within Staszów County, Świętokrzyskie Voivodeship, in south-central Poland.

The village has a population of 466.

Demography 
According to the 2002 Poland census, there were 466 people residing in Gacki village, of whom 51.3% were male and 48.7% were female. In the village, the population was spread out, with 26.2% under the age of 18, 36.9% from 18 to 44, 16.7% from 45 to 64, and 20.2% who were 65 years of age or older.
 Figure 1. Population pyramid of village in 2002 – by age group and sex

References

Villages in Staszów County